Neptunea contraria is a left-handed species of sea snail, a marine gastropod mollusk in the family Buccinidae, the true whelks.

Description
The length of the shell attains 100.9 mm.

Distribution
This species occurs in the Mediterranean Sea off Sicily

References

 Fraussen K. & Terryn Y. (2007). The family Buccinidae. Genus Neptunea. In: A Conchological Iconography [Directed by Guido T. Poppe & Klaus Groh]. ConchBooks, Hackenheim. 159 pp., 154 pls
 de Kluijver, M. J.; Ingalsuo, S. S.; de Bruyne, R. H. (2000). Macrobenthos of the North Sea [CD-ROM]: 1. Keys to Mollusca and Brachiopoda. World Biodiversity Database CD-ROM Series. Expert Center for Taxonomic Identification (ETI): Amsterdam, The Netherlands. ISBN 3-540-14706-3. 1 cd-rom
 Howson, C.M.; Picton, B.E. (1997). The species directory of the marine fauna and flora of the British Isles and surrounding seas. Ulster Museum Publication, 276. The Ulster Museum: Belfast, UK. ISBN 0-948150-06-8. vi, 508 (+ cd-rom) pp.

External links
 Linnaeus C. (1771). Mantissa plantarum: Generum editionis VI. et specierum editionis II. L. Salvius, Holmiae
 Deshayes, G. P. (1830-1832). Encyclopédie méthodique ou par ordre de matières. Histoire naturelle des Vers et Mollusques. Vol. 2: viii+1-594
  Bouchet, P. & Warén, A. (1985). Revision of the Northeast Atlantic bathyal and abyssal Neogastropoda excluding Turridae (Mollusca, Gastropoda). Bollettino Malacologico. supplement 1: 121-296

Buccinidae
Molluscs described in 1771
Taxa named by Carl Linnaeus